Follen Church is a historic Unitarian Universalist congregation located at 755 Massachusetts Avenue in Lexington, Massachusetts.

History
The church is named for Charles Follen who was the first minister called by the church, in 1835. Follen served the congregation from 1835 to 1836 and from 1839 to 1840. Ralph Waldo Emerson was the minister of the congregation, then called the Christian Association of East Lexington, from 1836 to 1838. This was his last ministerial position.

Follen Church, built in 1839, is the oldest standing church building in Lexington. The unique octagonal sanctuary was designed by its first minister, Rev. Follen however he never preached in the sanctuary. He died en route to the dedication ceremony in a wreck at sea. It was named in his honor in 1885.

On April 30, 1976, the church was added to the National Register of Historic Places as the Follen Community Church.

As of August 2013, Rev. Claire Feingold Thoryn has joined Follen as the church's settled minister. Beryl Aschenberg is the Director of Religious Education. Chris Eastburn is the Director of Music.

See also
National Register of Historic Places listings in Middlesex County, Massachusetts

References

External links

 Follen Church Society website
 Follen Church Society Official Facebook Page

Buildings and structures in Lexington, Massachusetts
Churches in Middlesex County, Massachusetts
Churches on the National Register of Historic Places in Massachusetts
National Register of Historic Places in Middlesex County, Massachusetts
Octagonal churches in the United States
Unitarian Universalist churches in Massachusetts